Novaya Sbrodovka is a rural locality (a village) in Starotumbagushevsky Selsoviet, Sharansky District, Bashkortostan, Russia. The population was 15 as of 2010. There is 1 street.

Geography 
Novaya Sbrodovka is located 15 km north of Sharan (the district's administrative centre) by road. Yelan-Yelga is the nearest rural locality.

References 

Rural localities in Sharansky District